Super Sport, or SS, is the signature performance option package offered by Chevrolet on a limited number of its vehicles.  All SS models come with distinctive "SS" markings on their exterior. The SS package was first made available for the 1961 Impala. Some of the other models bearing the SS badge include the Camaro, Chevelle, El Camino, Impala, Monte Carlo, Nova and Chevrolet Pickup Trucks. Current SS models are produced by the GM Performance Division.

General Motors Company's Australian subsidiary Holden offers SS models in its range of Holden Commodore sedans and sportwagons, and also in the Holden Ute range of two-door coupé utilities.

History
In December 1956, Chevrolet unveiled a show car based on the first generation (C1) Corvette called the Corvette Super Sport. In early 1957, the Chevrolet Corvette SS debuted — a custom built racing sports car that was the first Chevrolet to wear the SS badge.

In 1961, the SS "kit" (known as a sport and appearance package) was offered on any Impala for just $53.80. The package included Super Sport trim for both the interior and exterior, chassis reinforcements, stronger springs and shocks, power brakes, spinner wheel covers, and narrow-band whitewall tires. The car's dashboard received a Corvette style passenger hand bar and a steering column mounted 7000-rpm tachometer.  Chevrolet built 491,000 Impalas that year and 453 had the SS package, of which 311 received the 348 cid and 142 received the 409 cid. Since 1994, the SS package has been used on a variety of GM vehicles, including pickup trucks, four-door sedans, and front wheel drive cars.

Both historically and today, the Super Sport package has typically included high-performance tires, heavy-duty suspension, and increased power, along with a variety of other performance and appearance upgrades.

SS models

Current SS models
 Chevrolet Camaro:  LT1 V8 producing

Previous SS models

Cars

Chevrolet (Commodore) SS:  LS3 V8 producing  2014-2017
 Chevrolet Cobalt:  turbocharged Ecotec LNF I4 producing  2008–2010 (4 door, 2009)
 Chevrolet Cobalt:  supercharged Ecotec LSJ I4 producing  2005–2007
 Chevrolet Cobalt:  Ecotec LE5 I4 producing  2006–2008
Chevrolet HHR:  turbocharged Ecotec LNF I4 producing  2008–2010
 Chevrolet Impala 1961–1969, 1994–1996, 2004–2009
 Chevrolet Malibu/Malibu Maxx 2006–2007
 Chevrolet Chevelle 1964–1973
 Chevrolet Camaro 1967–1972, 1996–2002
 Chevrolet El Camino 1968–1987
 Chevrolet Chevy II Nova 1963–1968 
 Chevrolet Nova 1969–1976 
 Chevrolet Monte Carlo 1970–1971, 1983–1988, 2000–2007

Trucks
 Chevrolet 454 SS 1990–1993
 Chevrolet S10 SS 1994–1998
 Chevrolet SSR:  LS2 V8
 Chevrolet Silverado SS
 Chevrolet Silverado Intimidator SS
 Chevrolet TrailBlazer SS:  LS2 V8 2006–2009

Middle Eastern market
 Chevrolet Caprice: rebadge of Impala SS (performance version of 4th generation Chevrolet Caprice sedan),  LT1 V8 producing  1995–1996
 Chevrolet Caprice: rebadge of Holden Caprice,  LS1 V8 producing  1999–2006,  L98 V8 producing  2006–2009,  L77 V8 producing  2009–2015,  LS3 V8 producing  2015–2017
Chevrolet Lumina coupé: rebadge of third generation Holden Monaro CV8,  LS1 V8 producing  2002–2006
Chevrolet Lumina sedan: rebadge of Holden Commodore SS sedan 2000–2011

South African market
For a short period of time in the early 1970s, a Holden Monaro–based "Chevrolet SS" model, similar in design, size and drivetrain to a Nova SS, was available in South Africa. Unlike the contemporary Nova, it was built as a hardtop, without fixed #2 or B-pillars or frames around the door glass.

Similar to Middle Eastern market, Holden Commodore-based Chevrolet Lumina SS was also offered in South Africa as sedan and also as ute until 2012.

Brazilian market
Classics:

 Chevrolet Opala:  250 I6 producing  1971–1974
 Chevrolet Opala:  250-S I6 producing  1974–1980
 Chevrolet Opala  151-S I4 producing  1974–1980

New Era:

 Chevrolet Astra  Family II I4 producing  2006
 Chevrolet Corsa  Family 1 SOHC 8-valve I4 producing  2006
 Chevrolet Meriva  Family 1 SOHC 8-valve I4 producing  2006

Australia (Holden)
Classics:

Holden SS Sedan: 4.2L (253 cu in) 253 V8 or 5.0L (308 cu in) 308 V8
Holden LX Torana SS Hatchback: 3.3L (202 cu in) 202 I6, 4.2L (253 cu in) 253 V8 or 5.0L (308 cu in) 308 V8
Holden VL Commodore SS: 5.0L (304 cu in) 5000i V8
Holden Special Vehicles Group A SS: 5.0L (304 cu in) Enhanced 5000i V8
Holden VN Commodore SS: 5.0L (304 cu in) 5000i V8
Holden VP Commodore SS: 5.0L (304 cu in) 5000i V8
Holden VR Commodore SS: 5.0L (304 cu in) 5000i V8
Holden VN Commodore SS: 5.0L (304 cu in) 5000i V8
Holden VT Commodore SS: 5.0L (304 cu in) 5000i V8 or 5.7L (350 cu in) GM Gen III LS1 V8

Modern Era:

Holden VX Commodore SS: 5.7L (350 cu in) GM Gen III LS1 V8
Holden VU Ute SS: 5.7L (350 cu in) GM Gen III LS1 V8
Holden VY Commodore SS: 5.7L (350 cu in) GM Gen III LS1 V8
Holden VY Ute SS: 5.7L (350 cu in) GM Gen III LS1 V8
Holden VY Series II Commodore SS: 5.7L (350 cu in) GM Gen III LS1 V8
Holden VY Series II Ute SS: 5.7L (350 cu in) GM Gen III LS1 V8
Holden VZ Commodore SS: 5.7L (350 cu in) GM Gen III LS1 V8
Holden VZ Ute SS: 5.7L (350 cu in) GM Gen III LS1 V8
Limited Run VZ SSZ Runout Models both Sedan and Ute
Holden VE Commodore SS: 6.0L (364 cu in) GM Gen III L98 V8 2007-2010
Holden VE Ute SS: 6.0L (364 cu in) GM Gen IV L98 V8 2008-2010
Holden VE Sportwagon SS: 6.0L (364 cu in) GM Gen IV L98 V8 2009-2010
Holden VE Series II Commodore SS: 6.0L (364 cu in) GM Gen III L77 V8 2010-2013
Holden VE Series II Ute SS: 6.0L (364 cu in) GM Gen III L77 V8 2010-2013
Holden VE Series II Sportwagon SS: 6.0L (364 cu in) GM Gen IV L77 V8 2010-2013
All Models Available in Race-Specced 'SS V' Variant
Holden VF Commodore SS: 6.0L (364 cu in) GM Gen IV L77 V8 2013-2015
Holden VF Ute SS: 6.0L (364 cu in) GM Gen IV L77 V8 2013-2015
Holden VF Sportwagon SS: 6.0L (364 cu in) GM Gen IV L77 V8 2013-2015
Holden VF Series II Commodore SS: 6.2L (376 cu in) GM Gen IV LS3 V8 2015-2017
Holden VF Series II Ute SS: 6.2L (376 cu in) GM Gen IV LS3 V8 2015-2017
Holden VF Series II Sportwagon SS: 6.2L (376 cu in) GM Gen IV LS3 V8 2015-2017
Series I Models Available in Race-Specced 'SS V' Variant 
Series II Models Available in Race-Specced 'SS V Redline' Variant

Indonesian market
 Chevrolet Captiva  Ecotec LE5 I4 producing  2011

Concept car

In 2003, Chevrolet released a concept car they named the SS. A rear wheel drive sports car with a modern 430 hp small-block V8 engine and race-tuned suspension, it was billed as "a modern interpretation of Chevrolet's Super Sport heritage". Though never intended for production, the vehicle was used as a show car and to hint at what was ahead for Chevrolet sports car design.

Collectors market
It is usually easy to visually differentiate an SS from a "plain-Jane" model. However, it is more difficult to tell the difference between a genuine SS and a "clone", a non-SS vehicle that has been altered to look like an SS. Because of the number of SS clones in the marketplace, potential buyers are advised to do their research and contact their local car clubs for help to ensure that the vehicle is a true SS by running the VIN codes and casting numbers on the engine (this also includes the vehicle's build sheet especially if the SS package was a factory option).  Other non-SS vehicles altered to appear like them only use trim panels rather than aftermarket mechanical parts.

References

External links
 RSportsCars: Chevrolet SS Concept Car
 Super Sport Camaros

Chevrolet
Muscle cars
Official motorsports and performance division of automakers